Timeline of states of matter and phase transitions

 1895 – Pierre Curie discovers that induced magnetization is proportional to magnetic field strength
 1911 – Heike Kamerlingh Onnes discloses his research on superconductivity
 1912 – Peter Debye derives the T-cubed law for the low temperature heat capacity of a nonmetallic solid
 1925 – Ernst Ising presents the solution to the one-dimensional Ising model 
 1928 – Felix Bloch applies quantum mechanics to electrons in crystal lattices, establishing the quantum theory of solids
 1929 – Paul Adrien Maurice Dirac and Werner Karl Heisenberg develop the quantum theory of ferromagnetism
 1932 – Louis Eugène Félix Néel discovers antiferromagnetism
 1933 – Walther Meissner and Robert Ochsenfeld discover perfect superconducting diamagnetism
 1933–1937 – Lev Davidovich Landau develops the Landau theory of phase transitions
 1937 – Pyotr Leonidovich Kapitsa and John Frank Allen discover superfluidity
 1941 – Lev Davidovich Landau explains superfluidity
 1942 – Hannes Alfvén predicts magnetohydrodynamic waves in plasmas
 1944 – Lars Onsager publishes the exact solution to the two-dimensional Ising model
 1957 – John Bardeen, Leon Cooper, and Robert Schrieffer develop the BCS theory of superconductivity
 End of the 50s – Lev Davidovich Landau develops the theory of Fermi liquid
 1959 – Philip Warren Anderson predicts localization in disordered systems
 1972 – Douglas Osheroff, Robert C. Richardson, and David Lee discover that helium-3 can become a superfluid
 1974 – Kenneth G. Wilson develops the renormalization group technique for treating phase transitions
 1980 – Klaus von Klitzing discovers the quantum Hall effect
 1982 – Horst L. Stoermer and Daniel C. Tsui discover the fractional quantum Hall effect
 1983 – Robert B. Laughlin explains the fractional quantum Hall effect
 1987 – Karl Alexander Müller and Georg Bednorz discover high critical temperature ceramic superconductors
 2000 – CERN announced quark-gluon plasma, a new phase of matter.

References

States of Matter and Phase Transitions